The 2011–12 UCF Knights men's basketball team was an NCAA Division I college basketball team that represented the University of Central Florida and competes in Conference USA. They played their home games at UCF Arena in Orlando, Florida and were led by second-year head coach Donnie Jones.

Previous season
In the previous year, the Knights finished the season 21–12, 6–10 in C-USA play under the leadership of then first-year Head Coach Donnie Jones. The year was full of milestones for the UCF program, who following a 10–0 start to the season, in which they defeated #18 Florida, South Florida, and Miami, the Knights were nationally ranked for the first time in program history. At the time, UCF was one of only four schools to be ranked in the BCS standings and the AP men's basketball poll.

The Knights would continue to start the season on a 14–0 run before an 8-game skid that dropped them out of the national rankings. UCF was invited to the 2011 College Basketball Invitational where they beat St. Bonaventure in the first round and Rhode Island in the quarterfinals before falling to Creighton in the semifinals.

Pre-season

Departures

Class of 2011 signees

Roster

Schedule and results

|-
!colspan=8| Exhibition

|-
!colspan=8| Regular season

|-
!colspan=8| 2012 Conference USA tournament

|-
!colspan=8| 2012 National Invitation Tournament

|-

Rankings

References

UCF Knights men's basketball seasons
Ucf
Ucf
UCF Knights
UCF Knights